William B. Zinn (December 6, 1795 – 1875) was a nineteenth-century farmer, mill-owner, militia leader and politician, who ultimately freed his slaves and became one of the founders of the State of West Virginia.

Early life
Born on December 6, 1795 in what was then called Gladeville, in Preston County, Virginia (but which became Kingwood, West Virginia during his lifetime), William Zinn was born to Jacob Zinn (1773–1857) whose father had emigrated from Germany, and his second wife, Sarah "Sallie" (Byrne) Bland, the widow of Thomas Bland. He had three older half-brothers, and two younger brothers: Charles B. Zinn (1797–1863) and Peyton Zinn (1807–1860) and sisters Clara and Permelia Zinn Brown (1804–1886). He married at least twice. From his first wife ___Franklin, he inherited slaves and about $8000 in gold and other property when her parents died. His second wife was Juliet Caroline Franklin Zinn.

Career

Zinn farmed and operated a mill in Preston County, which the Baltimore and Ohio Railroad reached in the mid-1950s. In the 1850 census Zinn owned 22 slaves. At some time he may have freed most, for in the 1860 census he only owned three slaves, compared to the seven slaves owned by his fellow Unconditional Unionist, William Gay Brown, Sr. (who had succeeded him in the House of Delegates in 1832). Preston County voters elected Zinn to represent them, part-time, in the Virginia House of Delegates eight times. He also led the local militia, with the rank of Major.

After the Virginia Secession Convention of 1861 voted to secede from the Union over the vehement opposition of Preston County's delegates, Brown and James C. McGrew, Zinn became one of the Preston County leaders who attended the first Wheeling Convention in May 1861. Zinn served as the Convention's chairman beginning on May 13. The Secession Convention expelled Brown and McGrew on June 29, and five Preston county men voting in a confederate camp on October 24, 1861 elected others to replace them. By contrast, Major Zinn also served as Preston County's representatives to the Restored Government at Wheeling beginning on June 25, 1863 alongside McGrew.

Postwar career
After the war he served in the West Virginia House of Delegates for a term beginning in 1866 and then was elected to the state Senate and served until 1869. In 1870, Zinn and his wife Julie lived in Rowlesburg, a lumber and mill town that was the second largest in the county, along with two young men who worked on his farm.

Death
Zinn died in Preston County in 1875 and is buried in the family cemetery in Arthurville, West Virginia.

References 

Members of the Virginia House of Delegates
Members of the West Virginia House of Delegates
West Virginia state senators
People from Kingwood, West Virginia
People of Virginia in the American Civil War
1795 births
1875 deaths
19th-century American politicians